Erastus Booth Murphy (March 1, 1886 – March 10, 1975) was a Canadian professional ice hockey player. He played with the Montreal Wanderers of the National Hockey Association.

He was also a lacrosse player with the Capital Lacrosse Club in Ottawa.

References

1886 births
1975 deaths
Canadian ice hockey defencemen
Ice hockey people from Ottawa
Montreal Wanderers (NHA) players